Puimayen is a resort on the Atlantic Coast in the Rocha Department of southeastern Uruguay near the Brazilian border.

Geography
It borders the resort Barra del Chuy to the northeast.

Population
In 2011 Puimayen had a population of 505 permanent inhabitants and 1,374 dwellings.
 
Source: Instituto Nacional de Estadística de Uruguay

References

External links
INE map of Barra del Chuy and Puimayen

Populated places in the Rocha Department
Seaside resorts in Uruguay